The Sinos River basin is situated Northeast of the state of Rio Grande do Sul, Southern Brazil, covering two geomorphologic provinces: the Southern plateau and central depression. It is territory of the Guaíba basin and has an area of almost 800 km2, consisted 32 municipalities.

Drainage basins of Brazil
Landforms of Rio Grande do Sul